Escallonia paniculata is a tree in the Escalloniaceae family, native to Costa Rica, Panama and South America.

References

paniculata
Trees of Peru
Trees of Panama
Trees of Costa Rica
Trees of Ecuador
Trees of Colombia
Trees of Bolivia
Trees of Venezuela